ResNet may refer to:

Residential network, a computer network provided by a university to serve residence halls
Residual flow network, in graph theory
Residual neural network, a type of artificial neural network
Residential Energy Services Network (RESNET), an organization responsible for home energy ratings